The Serb National Council of Montenegro is a non-governmental organization representing the Serbs of Montenegro. Its president is Momčilo Vuksanović.

See also
Serb political parties in Montenegro
New Serb Democracy
Serb List (2012)

Other Serb national councils
Serb National Council, Croatia
Serb National Council of Kosovo and Metohija

References

Serbs of Montenegro
Serb organizations
2008 establishments in Montenegro
Ethnic organisations based in Montenegro